Los Angeles is currently defined by Nielsen Media Research as the second-largest television market in the United States, with all of the major U.S. television networks having affiliates serving the region. All of the major U.S. television networks are directly owned by the networks.

Currently, television stations that primarily serve Greater Los Angeles include:

 2 KCBS-TV Los Angeles (CBS)*
 3 KSGA-LD Los Angeles (LATV/Jewelry TV)
 4 KNBC Los Angeles (NBC)*
 5 KTLA Los Angeles (The CW)*
 6 KHTV-CD Los Angeles (MeTV+)* 
 7 KABC-TV Los Angeles (ABC)*
 8 KFLA-LD Los Angeles (NewsNet)
 9 KCAL-TV Los Angeles (Independent)
 10 KIIO-LD Los Angeles (Armenian independent)
 11 KTTV Los Angeles (Fox)* 
 12 KZNO-LD Big Bear Lake (Jewelry TV) 
 13 KCOP-TV  Los Angeles (MyNetworkTV)*
 14 KPOM-CD Ontario (Decades)*
 18 KSCI Long Beach (ShopHQ)
 20 KNLA-CD Los Angeles (Crossings TV)
 20 KVME-TV Bishop (Jewelry TV)
 22 KWHY-TV Los Angeles (Spanish Independent) 
 24 KVCR-DT San Bernardino (PBS)
 25 KNET-CD Los Angeles (Multicultural independent)
 26 KVHD-LD Los Angeles (Comfy TV)
 27 KSFV-CD Los Angeles (Jewelry TV)
 28 KCET Los Angeles (PBS)
 30 KPXN-TV San Bernardino (Ion Television)*
 31 KVMD Twentynine Palms (NTD America)
 33 KRVD-LD Banning (Vietnamese independent)
 34 KMEX-DT Los Angeles (Univision)*
 35 KTAV-LD Los Angeles (Almavision)*
 39 KHIZ-LD Los Angeles (beIN Sports Xtra)
 40 KTBN-TV Santa Ana (TBN)*
 44 KXLA Rancho Palos Verdes (LATV)
 45 KSKJ-CD Van Nuys (Daystar Español)
 46 KFTR-DT Ontario (UniMás)*
 50 KOCE-TV Huntington Beach (PBS)
 52 KVEA Corona (Telemundo)*
 54 KAZA-TV Los Angeles (MeTV)*
 56 KDOC-TV Anaheim (TCT)*
 57 KJLA Ventura (Visión Latina)
 58 KLCS Los Angeles (PBS)
 62 KRCA Riverside (Estrella TV)*
 63 KBEH Garden Grove (Canal de La Fe)
 64 KILM Inglewood (Bounce)*

Asterisk (*) indicates channel is a network owned-and-operated station.

Defunct stations 
 KBLM-LP—Riverside (1999–2016)
 KEEF-TV—Los Angeles (1987)
 KKOG-TV—Ventura (1968–69)
 KPAL-LP—Palmdale (1989–2012)
 KVST-TV—Los Angeles (1974–75)
 KVKV-LP—Victorville
 KVTU-LD—Agoura Hills (2004–10; 2016–20)

See also 
 Bally Sports SoCal
 Bally Sports West
 CBS News Los Angeles
 NBC Sports California
 Spectrum News 1
 Spectrum SportsNet
 Spectrum SportsNet LA

References 
 
Lists of television channels in the United States